Cities and towns under republic's jurisdiction:
Vladikavkaz (Владикавказ) (capital)
City districts:
Iristonsky (Иристонский)
Promyshlenny (Промышленный)
Urban-type settlements under the city district's jurisdiction:
Zavodskoy (Заводской)
Severo-Zapadny (Северо-Западный)
Zaterechny (Затеречный)
Districts:
Alagirsky (Алагирский)
Towns under the district's jurisdiction:
Alagir (Алагир)
with 20 rural okrugs under the district's jurisdiction.
Ardonsky (Ардонский)
Towns under the district's jurisdiction:
Ardon (Ардон)
with 8 rural okrugs under the district's jurisdiction.
Digorsky (Дигорский)
Towns under the district's jurisdiction:
Digora (Дигора)
with 5 rural okrugs under the district's jurisdiction.
Irafsky (Ирафский)
with 14 rural okrugs under the district's jurisdiction.
Kirovsky (Кировский)
with 7 rural okrugs under the district's jurisdiction.
Mozdoksky (Моздокский)
Towns under the district's jurisdiction:
Mozdok (Моздок)
with 17 rural okrugs under the district's jurisdiction.
Pravoberezhny (Правобережный)
Towns under the district's jurisdiction:
Beslan (Беслан)
with 10 rural okrugs under the district's jurisdiction.
Prigorodny (Пригородный)
with 19 rural okrugs under the district's jurisdiction.

References

North Ossetia–Alania
North Ossetia – Alania, Republic of